Mesonoterus is a genus of beetles in the family Noteridae, containing the following species:

 Mesonoterus addendus (Blatchley, 1920)
 Mesonoterus crassicornis (Régimbart, 1889)
 Mesonoterus grandicornis (Régimbart, 1899)
 Mesonoterus laevicollis Sharp, 1882

References

Noteridae
Adephaga genera